Donnie Ray Copeland (born March 16, 1961) is an American pastor and politician. He is the pastor of the Apostolic Pentecostal Church in North Little Rock, Arkansas. From 2015 through 2017, he served one term as a Republican member of the Arkansas House of Representatives for District 38 in Pulaski County.

Early career
Copeland attended the University of Louisiana at Monroe, when the institution was known as Northeast Louisiana University.

In 2010, Copeland polled 60,072 votes (48.1 percent) in the Republican primary election for lieutenant governor, having lost to Mark Darr, who received 64,883 votes (51.9 percent). Darr then defeated in the general election the Democrat Shane Broadway for the seat vacated by another Democrat, Bill Halter.

House of Representatives
In 2014, Copeland won the House position with 5,710 votes (51.5 percent), when he unseated the one-term Democrat Patti Julian, who polled 5,389 votes (48.5 percent). Copeland was succeeded in the House by fellow Republican Carlton Wing, who with 7,019 votes (52.1 percent) defeated the Democrat Victoria Leigh, who received 6,466 (48 percent). In his legislative term, Copeland served on these committees: (1) City, County and Local Affairs, (2) Judiciary, and (3) Public Retirement and Social Security.

Rather than seeking a second term in the state House, Copeland ran unsuccessfully on March 1, 2016, in the Republican primary for the District 34 seat in Arkansas State Senate. He polled 6,365 votes (48.8 percent) against the successful incumbent, Jane English, who received 6,687 votes (51.2 percent). English then defeated the Democrat Joe Woodson, also of North Little Rock, in the November 8 general election, 21,497 votes (58 percent) to 15,541 (42 percent).

References

1961 births
Living people
Republican Party members of the Arkansas House of Representatives
American clergy
American Pentecostals
Politicians from Monroe, Louisiana
Politicians from North Little Rock, Arkansas
University of Louisiana at Monroe alumni